Giovanni Bettinelli (5 March 1935 – 5 July 2000) was an Italian racing cyclist. He rode in the 1962 Tour de France.

References

External links
 

1935 births
2000 deaths
Italian male cyclists
Place of birth missing
Cyclists from the Metropolitan City of Venice